ABC4 may refer to:

Television stations in the United States
 KITV, Honolulu, Hawaii
 KLBY, Colby, Kansas
 KNEP, Scottsbluff, Nebraska
 KOMO-TV, Seattle, Washington
 KPRY-TV, Pierre, South Dakota
 KTVX, Salt Lake City, Utah
 KXLY-TV, Spokane, Washington
 WCIV-DT2, Charleston, South Carolina
 WMOW-DT2, Crandon, Wisconsin
 WOAY-TV, Oak Hill, West Virginia
 WOTV, Battle Creek, Michigan  (cable channel; broadcasts on channel 41)
 WTAE-TV, Pittsburgh, Pennsylvania
 KHMT, Billings, Montana (1987 to 1994)
 WCIV, Charleston, South Carolina (1996 to 2014)

Other
 The former on-air branding for Australian ABC Kids